The Rural Municipality of Scott No. 98 is a rural municipality (RM) in the Canadian province of Saskatchewan within Census Division No. 2 and  Division No. 2. It is located in the southeast portion of the province.

History 
The RM of Scott No. 98 incorporated as a rural municipality on December 13, 1909.

Geography

Communities and localities 
The following urban municipalities are surrounded by the RM.

Villages
 Yellow Grass
 Lang

The following unincorporated communities are within the RM.

Localities
 Lewvan
 Ibsen

Demographics 

Economy 
Agriculture is the major industry in the RM.

Government 
The RM of Scott No. 98 is governed by an elected municipal council and an appointed administrator that meets on the second Tuesday of every month. The reeve of the RM is Ryley Richards while its administrator is Shelly Verbeurgt. The RM's office is located in Yellow Grass.

Transportation 
The Lewvan (Farr Air) Airport is within the rural municipality.

References 

Scott

Division No. 2, Saskatchewan